The 1972 United States Senate election in New Hampshire took place on November 7, 1972. Incumbent Democratic Senator Thomas J. McIntyre won re-election to a third term. Democrats would not win this seat again until 2008.

Primary elections
Primary elections were held on September 12, 1972.

Democratic primary

Candidates
Thomas J. McIntyre, incumbent United States Senator

Results

Republican primary

Candidates
Peter J. Booras, businessman
David A. Brock, former United States Attorney
Marshall W. Cobleigh, Speaker of the New Hampshire House of Representatives
Wesley Powell, former Governor

Results

General election

Results

See also 
 1972 United States Senate elections

References

Bibliography
 
 
 

1972
New Hampshire
United States Senate